"Chasse" is Kaori Utatsuki's 2nd single under Geneon Entertainment. It was released on November 21, 2007. The title track was used as the third ending theme for the anime series Hayate no Gotoku!. It managed to get in the #30 spot in the Oricon charts with a total sales of 4,984 copies in its first week.

Track listing 
Chasse—3:45
Composition: Kazuya Takase
Arrangement: Tomoyuki Nakazawa, Maiko Iuchi
Lyrics: Kotoko
Change of Heart—5:12
Composition: Maiko Iuchi
Arrangement: Maiko Iuchi
Lyrics: Kaori Utatsuki
Chasse (instrumental) -- 3:45
Change of Heart (instrumental) -- 5:11

References

2007 singles
2007 songs
Kaori Utatsuki songs
Song recordings produced by I've Sound
Songs with lyrics by Kotoko (musician)